Pohole, also known as  hō'i'o  is an edible fiddlehead fern eaten in Hawaiian cuisine salad. The salads are made the unfurled fronds of a Diplazium esculentum fern (also known as Athyrium esculentum). The ferns grow in wet areas of shady valleys. The fern species Diplazium esculentum is believed to have been introduced and naturalized in Hawaii and was first reported collected in 1910. The fern also has medicinal uses.

References

Ferns of the United States
Hawaiian cuisine